Scandium trifluoromethanesulfonate, commonly called scandium triflate, is a chemical compound with formula Sc(SO3CF3)3, a salt consisting of scandium cations Sc3+ and triflate  anions.

Scandium triflate is used as a reagent in organic chemistry as a Lewis acid. Compared to other Lewis acids, this reagent is stable towards water and can often be used in organic reactions as a true catalyst rather than one used in stoichiometric amounts. The compound is prepared by reaction of scandium oxide with trifluoromethanesulfonic acid.

An example of the scientific use of scandium triflate is the Mukaiyama aldol addition reaction between benzaldehyde and the silyl enol ether of cyclohexanone with an 81% yield.

See also 

 Lanthanide trifluoromethanesulfonates

References

Scandium compounds
Triflates
Acid catalysts